Saidabad-e Sofla (also Romanized as Sa‘īdābād-e Soflā; also known as Sa‘īdābād, Saiyidābād, Seyyedābād, and Seyyedābād-e Pā’īn) is a village in Esmaili Rural District, Esmaili District, Anbarabad County, Kerman Province, Iran. At the 2006 census, its population was 185, in 35 families.

References 

Populated places in Anbarabad County